Night in Tunisia was the first book by Irish writer Neil Jordan in 1976, containing ten stories and was published by The Irish Writers Co-operative (Co-op Books) in Dublin. The story's title is a jazz standard composed by Dizzy Gillespie. It won a Somerset Maugham Award and in 1979 it won the Guardian Fiction Prize and was then published by Writers and Readers in the UK and by George Braziller in the US.

Stories
"Last Orders" - In Kensal Rise a young hod carrier from Dublin commits suicide by slashing his wrists in the local Victorian bath house surrounded by other navvies.
"Seduction" - Every August the narrator meets his friend Jamie in an Irish seaside resort where they talk about girls, as their sexuality reveals itself.
"Sand" - On a beach a boy is offered a half-an hour ride on a tinker's donkey on a beach in exchange for the tinkers 'go' on his nearby sister Jean. He accepts but doesn't realise what the tinker really meant when he hears his sister's screams.
"Mr Solomon Wept" - He runs an amusement arcade in Laytown in County Meath where his wife left him a year ago on the anniversary of the Laytown Races. He now realises his depth of his love for her.
"Night in Tunisia" - The narrator's father plays jazz on the tenor saxophone at Butlins and pays his son to learn to play the alto saxophone.  The narrator is more fascinated by the changes of his sisters body and by that of a local tennis-playing women wearing a yellow cardigan...
"Skin" - An Irish housewife in Dublin had prepared dinner and re-reads about 'Swedish Housewive's Afternoon of Sin'. She then drives to Howth and paddles in the sea where she notices a man watching her.
"Her Soul" - A drunk woman looks at the shadows then meets a man on the stairs at a party and has a drink with him.
"Outpatient" - A young wife returns from a catholic retreat to her husband, together they plan to move to house near Portmarnock.
"Tree" - John cannot drive or step out of a car, the narrator believes she sees a whitethorn tree but John tells her that it cannot. As they leave a pub they then have a row and she walks away from the car and sees another whitethorn with rags tied to the branches and faded pictures nailed to the trunk with pleas on them.
"A Love" - During the funeral procession of Éamon de Valera in Dublin a young man meets his old girlfriend and talks about their early relationship.

Reception
From Scribd the book is praised:
"His fiction is poetic in the best sense of the word, which is to say that he manipulates certain images skillfully without using more words than necessary. This is an exciting book by the kind of writer who makes you curious about what he'll do next." - Washington Post
"Night in Tunisia is my book of the year...Jordan's precise control of tone, style and narrative deserves comparison with other Irish masters of the short story form - O'Connor, O'Faolain, and Joyce. Here's to the Jordan to come." - Time Out
"Bristling with talent and promise." - Irish Times

References

1976 short story collections
Irish short story collections
Debut books
1976 debut works